Auroralumina is a genus of cnidarians from the Ediacaran of Charnwood Forest; the only species is Auroralumina attenboroughii. It is the earliest known animal predator.

Fossil

Biology

The fossil, whose name recalls the Latin for "dawn lantern", has been described as the earliest known animal predator: since its structure places it among the cnidaria, which have stinging cells (cnidocytes) on their tentacles, it is presumed that they used these to catch small planktonic animals. The fossil consists of a pair of bifurcating (forking) tubes in which the animals lived, the earliest such structure to be recorded. It has been dated to 560 million years ago using zircon crystals in the rock. The only species in the genus, A. attenboroughii, is named for the English natural history presenter David Attenborough, who went to school in Leicestershire, where the fossil was found.

Phylogeny 

Phylogenetic analyses recover Auroralumina as a stem-group medusozoan.

References

Ediacaran life
Fossil taxa described in 2022
David Attenborough
Prehistoric cnidarian genera
Medusozoa